The tug of war in astronomy is the ratio of planetary and solar attractions on a natural satellite. The term was coined by Isaac Asimov in The Magazine of Fantasy and Science Fiction in 1963.

Law of universal gravitation 

According to Isaac Newton's law of universal gravitation

In this equation 
F is the force of attraction
G is the gravitational constant
m1 and m2 are the masses of two bodies
d is the distance between the two bodies

The two main attraction forces on a satellite are the attraction of the Sun and the satellite's primary (the planet the satellite orbits). Therefore, the two forces are 

where the subscripts p and s represent the primary and the sun respectively, and m is the mass of the satellite.

The ratio of the two is

Example 
Callisto is a satellite of Jupiter. The parameters in the equation are 

Callisto–Jupiter distance (dp) is 1.883 · 106 km.
Mass of Jupiter (Mp) is 1.9 · 1027 kg 
Jupiter–Sun distance (i.e. mean distance of Callisto from the Sun, ds) is 778.3 · 106 km. 
The solar mass (Ms) is 1.989 · 1030 kg

The ratio 163 shows that the solar attraction is much weaker than the planetary attraction.

The table of planets 

Asimov lists tug-of-war ratio for 32 satellites (then known in 1963) of the Solar System. The list below shows one example from each planet.

The special case of the Moon 
Unlike other satellites of the solar system, the solar attraction on the Moon is more than that of its primary. According to Asimov, the Moon is a planet moving around the Sun in careful step with the Earth.

References 

Moons
Gravity
Astronomical dynamical systems